The Berliner (also known as The Ballad of Berlin) is a 1948 German comedy film adapted by Günter Neumann from his cabaret, directed by Robert A. Stemmle, and starring Gert Fröbe in his first leading role. It offers a satirical portrayal of life in Berlin in the aftermath of World War II.

Plot
The film has a framing narrative set in 2048 where viewers are offered the chance to look back at "The Ancients", which introduces the main narrative set in 1948.  The film reflects the struggles of Otto Normalverbraucher (Otto Average-Consumer, played by Fröbe), a former German soldier returning to civilian life in Berlin after World War II. After many travails, struggling to find food, shelter, and work, he eventually falls in love and ends up happily with his dream woman.

Production
The film was adapted by Günter Neumann from his cabaret program Schwarzer Jahrmarkt, was filmed in West Berlin at the time of the Soviet blockade, and shot on location and at the Tempelhof Studios. The film was narrated by Erik Ode. Joseph Burstyn Inc. distributed the film in the U.S.

Cast
 Gert Fröbe as Otto Normalverbraucher
 Tatjana Sais as Frau Ida Holle
 Ute Sielisch as Eva Wandel, Bäuerin
 Aribert Wäscher as Anton Zeithammer
 O.E. Hasse as Der Reaktionär
 Hans Deppe as Emil Lemke
 Werner Oehlschlaeger as Raisonneur
 Karl Schönböck as 	Rundfunkreporter
 Herbert Hübner as 	Herr Bollmann, politischer Redner
 Alfred Schieske as 	Herr Schneidewind, Politischer Redner
 Herbert Weissbach as 	Spirituosenhändler
 Kurt Weitkamp as 	Einbrecher
 Franz-Otto Krüger as 	Einbrecher Franz

Critical reception
The Darmstädter Echo praised it for its lack of spite and viciousness and its humor and humanity. Angelica Fenner compares the film to Bertolt Brecht with devices such as the omniscient narrator, prototypical characters, and satirical tone. Sabine Hake points out that although within the genre of post-war Trümmerfilme (rubble film) it offers a refreshing change from the majority of those films through its use of satirical humor. However, Stephen Brockmann has criticised the film for portraying an optimistic message about the survival of the human spirit after World War II while ignoring the causes of the war.

Awards
It was nominated for a BAFTA for Best Film from any Source in the 1950 ceremony, when it was beaten by Bicycle Thieves.  It won an International Prize at the 10th Venice International Film Festival in 1949.

References

External links

1948 films
1940s satirical films
1940s science fiction comedy films
West German films
1940s German-language films
Films set in Berlin
Films shot in Berlin
Fiction set in 2050
German satirical films
German science fiction comedy films
German black-and-white films
Films shot at Tempelhof Studios
1948 comedy films
1940s German films
Films directed by Robert A. Stemmle